The Paleontological Sites of Santa Maria are located in the city of Santa Maria, Rio Grande do Sul, Brazil and dating from the Triassic. Are in the Santa Maria Formation and Caturrita Formation.

History
In 1901 the first fossils were found in the town of Santa Maria, which began the Geopark Paleorrota. Since then many sites have been discovered in the city, especially near the Hill Cerrito, with outstanding attention to Sanga da Alemoa that have rich history.

Tourism
The city of Santa Maria is a major road junction, with several highways across the city. The Hill Cerrito is surrounded by highways BR-287, BR-158 and RS-509. You should be prepared to receive tourists.

Museums
Santa Maria has two museums that contain fossils of the region:
Museum Vincente Pallotti
Educational Museum Gama D'Eça

Description of sites

Notes and references

See also
Paleorrota Geopark
Museum Vincente Pallotti
Educational Museum Gama D'Eça
Paleontological Site Arroio Cancela
Paleontological Site Sanga of Alemoa
Paleontological Site Jazigo Cinco

Natural history of Brazil
Mesozoic paleontological sites of South America
Historical geology
Paleontological sites of Brazil
Triassic paleontological sites